Newsweek Argentina is an Argentine monthly news magazine, published as the local edition of Newsweek. Its editorial director was Alex Milberg, and its senior editor was Matías Loewy.

History and profile
The magazine was inaugurated on August 2, 2006, and belonged to Sergio Szpolski's media group, Grupo Veintitrés'. Szpolski sold a 50% share therein to Matías Garfunkel.

The magazine included both articles and editorials written in the Argentine bureau located in Palermo, Buenos Aires, as well as translations from the namesake U.S. publication. Part of the magazine was also distributed as an in-flight magazine in Aerolíneas Argentinas and Austral Líneas Aéreas as a reprint within Cielos Argentinos.

Regular contributors included: Rosendo Fraga, Sergio Bergman, and Lucas Llach (Economics); Ana Gerschenson (Argentine politics); Juan Pablo de Santis (Business); Alejandro Zanoni (information technology); and Tamara di Tella (Argentine culture).

The magazine was closed in 2014, however, on June 30, 2022, the magazine was reintroduced as a second stage, this time under group Alpha Media's management.

References

Newsweek
2006 establishments in Argentina
2014 disestablishments in Argentina
2022 establishments in Argentina
News magazines published in Argentina
Magazines established in 2006
Magazines disestablished in 2014
Magazines established in 2022
Spanish-language magazines
Monthly magazines published in Argentina